James K. Kamsickas (born 1966) is an American businessman, the chairman and CEO of Dana Incorporated.

Kamsickas earned a bachelor's degree in business administration from Central Michigan University (1989), an MBA from Michigan State University, and an honorary doctor of commercial science degree from Central Michigan University (2018).

Kamsickas has been CEO of Dana since August 2015, and chairman since December 2019.

References

1960s births
Living people
American business executives
Central Michigan University alumni
Michigan State University alumni